The surname Crabtree may refer to:
 Arthur Crabtree (1900–1975), a British cinematographer
 Bill Crabtree (1915–2001), an Australian politician
 Brian Crabtree (born 1938), a British wrestling announcer
 Clyde Crabtree (1905–1994), an American college and professional football player
 Don Crabtree (1912–1980), an American flintknapper and pioneering experimental archaeologist
 Eorl Crabtree (born 1982), a British Rugby League player
 Eric Crabtree, (born 1944), a former NFL player
 Estel Crabtree, a Major League Baseball player in the 1930s and 1940s
 George Crabtree (born 1944), an American physicist
 Gerald Crabtree, an American biochemist
 Grant Crabtree (1913–2008), an award-winning cinematographer, director and photographer
 Helen Crabtree (1915–2002), an important woman in the history of Saddle Seat Riding
 Herbert Grace Crabtree, an English biochemist
 Jack Crabtree (American football), a former American football player
 Jack Crabtree (artist), an English contemporary artist
 Jane Crabtree (born 1981), an Australia badminton player
 Jimmy Crabtree (1871–1908), an English football player
 Jimmy Crabtree (footballer, born 1895) (1895–1965), English footballer
 Joe Crabtree, British drummer
 Julian Crabtree, a long-distance swimmer and adventurer
 Lotta Crabtree (1847–1924), an American actor and comedian
 Max Crabtree (born 1933), a British wrestler promoter
 Michael Crabtree (born 1987), an American NFL wide receiver for Arizona Cardinals
 Mike Crabtree, a British racing driver
 Robert H. Crabtree, a British chemist
 Shirley Crabtree aka Big Daddy (1930–1997), an English professional wrestler
 Steve Crabtree (born 1955), an American journalist
 Susan Crabtree, senior editor of The Hill
 Tim Crabtree, a Major League Baseball pitcher for the Toronto Blue Jays and Texas Rangers
 Tom Crabtree, American football tight end
 William Crabtree (1610–1644), an astronomer, mathematician
 William Crabtree (architect) (1905–1991), an English architect

Fictional characters
 Constance, Lady Crabtree, a comedy character created by the author and broadcaster Paul James in 1978
 Kelly Crabtree, a character from the UK television ITV soap opera Coronation Street
 Miss Crabtree, a schoolteacher in Our Gang a.k.a. "The Little Rascals" short subjects
 Officer Crabtree, a character from 'Allo 'Allo!
 Veronica Crabtree, a character from South Park
 Constable George Crabtree, a character in Murdoch Mysteries
 Chester and Clara Crabtree, Moose and Molly's cranky neighbors in the comic strip Moose & Molly

See also
 Crabtree (disambiguation)